McMorrin may refer to:

 Anna McMorrin (born 1971), Welsh Labour Party politician
 McMorrin Glacier, glacier in Antarctica